Antón Arrufat Mrad (born 14 August 1935, in Santiago de Cuba, Cuba) is a Cuban dramatist, novelist, short story writer, poet and essayist.

Arrufat is of mixed Catalan and Lebanese parentage. At the age of 11, he moved with his family from Santiago de Cuba to Havana. He studied philology at the University of Havana. His first book appeared in 1962, a collection of his early poems. He won the Premio Nacional de Literatura de Cuba in 2000.

The Antón Arrufat Papers are held at Princeton University Library. The consist "of manuscripts of poems, short stories, novels, and criticism by Antón Arrufat, Virgilio Piñera, and Witold Gombrowicz; and correspondence of Antón Arrufat."

Works
 El caso se investiga, pieza estrenada en 1957
 En claro, poesía, 1962
 Mi antagonista y otras observaciones, cuentos, 1963
 Repaso final, poesía, 1963
 Teatro, colección de piezas, 1963
 Todos los domingos, teatro, 1964
 Escrito en las puertas, poesía, 1968
 Los siete contra Tebas teatro, 1968
 La caja está cerrada, novela, 1984
 La huella en la arena, poesía, 1986
 La tierra permanente, teatro, 1987
 ¿Qué harás después de mí?, cuentos, 1988
 Las pequeñas cosas, prosas, 1988
 Cámara de amor, teatro, 1994
 Lirios sobre un fondo de espadas, poesía, 1995
 La divina Fanny, teatro, 1995
 Virgilio Piñera: entre él y yo, ensayo, 1995
 Ejercicios para hacer de la esterilidad virtud, cuentos, 1998
 El viejo carpintero, poesía, 1999
 La noche del Aguafiestas, novela, 2000
 Las tres partes del criollo, teatro, 2003
 El hombre discursivo, ensayos, ed Letras Cubanas, 2005
 El convidado del juicio, ensayos, ed. Ediciones Unión, 2015

References

Cuban male writers
1935 births
Living people
University of Havana alumni
Cuban people of Catalan descent
Cuban people of Lebanese descent